The Edris House is a mid-century modern house designed by E. Stewart Williams in Palm Springs, California for William and Majorie Edris in 1954. The house is situated on a rocky outcrop, with the exterior of the house clad in wood. Edris was the owner of the Fairmont Olympic Hotel in Seattle, Washington.

The house was later owned by J. R. Roberts, former managing director of the Palm Springs Art Museum and Design Center.

The house was listed on the National Register of Historic Places in 2016.

References

E. Stewart Williams buildings
Modernist architecture in California
Buildings and structures in Palm Springs, California
Tourist attractions in Palm Springs, California
Houses completed in 1954
National Register of Historic Places in Riverside County, California
Houses on the National Register of Historic Places in California